Lewis Gompertz ( – 2 December 1861) was an English writer and inventor, and early animal rights and veganism advocate. He was a founding member, in June 1824, of the English Society for the Prevention of Cruelty to Animals; later the RSPCA. Gompertz was the younger brother of the mathematician and actuary Benjamin Gompertz and the poet Isaac Gompertz.

Biography

Gompertz was born into a large and wealthy family of London diamond merchants, the fifth son of his father Solomon Barent Gompertz's (1729 – ) second marriage. Being Jewish, Gompertz and his siblings were not allowed to attend university and instead received an informal education.

Gompertz was a vegan and opposed to humans intentionally using animals for human interests in any way. He refused to wear leather or silk and declined to ride in coaches due to the suffering of the horses. He was the inventor of a multitude of inventions—including the expanding chuck—many of them designed to reduce animal suffering. In 1821, Gompertz invented an improved velocipede, an early form of bicycle. His machine was powered by pulling on the steering handles, which drove a rack and pinion mechanism, which in turn rotated the front wheel.

He was one of the founding members for the Society for the Prevention of Cruelty to animals, attending its inaugural meeting in 1824. He published his first book Moral Inquiries on the Situation of Man and of Brutes, in the same year, which laid out his ethical views on animals; the book was also critical of capitalism and the oppression of women and praised Owenism. Gompertz acted as the SPCA's second Honorary Secretary, before resigning in 1833, after the governing committee objected to Gompertz's promotion of "Pythagorean doctrines", which held that the feelings of animals and humans were of equal value. The committee had created a resolution that limited membership in the SPCA to Christians. Since Gompertz was a Jew, he was forced to resign.

Gompertz went on to found the Animals' Friend Society for the Prevention of Cruelty to Animals, which he ran until 1846, after which he resigned to care for Ann, his terminally ill wife. The society was welcoming to evangelicals and Quakers. His wife died in 1847 and he spent the remainder of his life writing and speaking about animal rights and welfare and creating inventions. In 1852, he published his second book on animals Fragments in Defence of Animals.

He died from bronchitis at his home in Kennington, on 2 December 1861 and was buried in the graveyard of the local church.

Selected publications

Moral Inquiries on the Situation of Man and of Brutes (1824; 1992, edited by Peter Singer; 1997, edited by Charles R. Magel)
Mechanical Inventions and Suggestions on Land and Water Locomotion (1851)
Fragments in Defence of Animals, and Essays on Morals, Soul, and Future State (1852)
Index to 38 Inventions of L. G. (1856)

See also
 List of animal rights advocates

Notes

References

Further reading

External links
 

Year of birth uncertain
1780s births
1861 deaths
19th-century English male writers
Anti-vivisectionists
British anti-capitalists
British veganism activists
Deaths from bronchitis
English animal rights activists
English animal rights scholars
English humanitarians
English inventors
English Jewish writers
English Jews
English male non-fiction writers
English people of German-Jewish descent
Founders of charities
Lewis Gompertz
Jewish English activists
People from Hampstead